North Benton is an unincorporated community in northern Smith Township, Mahoning County, Ohio, United States. It has a post office with the ZIP code 44449. It lies along State Route 14 between Salem and Ravenna.

The community is part of the Youngstown-Warren-Boardman, OH-PA Metropolitan Statistical Area.

History
North Benton was platted in 1834 and was named for Thomas Hart Benton, senator from Missouri. The prefix North was added in order to avoid repetition with another Benton. A post office called North Benton has been in operation since 1835.

References

External links
 NorthBenton.com.

Unincorporated communities in Mahoning County, Ohio
1834 establishments in Ohio
Populated places established in 1834
Unincorporated communities in Ohio